Grand Rapids is an unincorporated community in LaMoure County, in the U.S. state of North Dakota.

History
A post office called Grand Rapids was established in 1880, and remained in operation until 1966. The community took its name from the rapids in the James River.

References

Unincorporated communities in LaMoure County, North Dakota
Unincorporated communities in North Dakota